Helictonema is a monotypic genus of flowering plants belonging to the family Celastraceae. The only species is Helictonema velutinum.

Its native range is Western Tropical Africa to Uganda.

References

Celastraceae
Celastrales genera
Monotypic rosid genera